Colebrook Home was a South Australian institution for Australian Aboriginal children run by the United Aborigines Mission from 1924 (named Colebrook in 1927) to 1981, existing at four different locations over its lifetime.

History
Colebrook Home existed at four separate locations through its lifetime.

The United Aborigines Mission first established a home in 1924 near Oodnadatta, although it was not known as Colebrook Home at that time. 

The home then moved to a place called Colebrook, just outside Quorn in 1927, where it became known as Colebrook Home.Adelaide businessman and philanthropist A. E. Gerard (1877–1950), who was involved with the foundation of Colebrook, wrote about its early days in his publication History of the UAM (1944).

In 1944 it was moved to Eden Hills, just outside Adelaide. That site closed in 1972, and is now the site of the Colebrook Reconciliation Park. The original Colebrook at Quorn is now a small Aboriginal community.

Its last location was in Blackwood, a hills suburb of Adelaide.

Legacy
Colebrook Home was mentioned in the Bringing Them Home Report (1997) as an institution that housed Indigenous children forcibly removed from their families.

See also
Doreen Kartinyeri
Lowitja O'Donoghue
Faith Thomas

References

1924 establishments in Australia
1972 disestablishments in Australia
Australian Aboriginal missions
Stolen Generations institutions